1 Corinthians 15 is the fifteenth chapter of the First Epistle to the Corinthians in the New Testament of the Christian Bible. It is authored by Paul the Apostle and Sosthenes in Ephesus. The first eleven verses contain the earliest account of the post-resurrection appearances of Jesus in the New Testament. The rest of the chapter stresses the primacy of the resurrection for Christianity.

Text
The original text was written in Koine Greek. This chapter is divided into 58 verses.

Textual witnesses
Some early manuscripts containing the text of this chapter are:
Codex Vaticanus (325–350)
Codex Sinaiticus (330–360)
Papyrus 123 (4th century; extant verses 3–6)
Codex Alexandrinus (400–440)
Codex Ephraemi Rescriptus (extant verses 41–58).
Codex Freerianus (extant verses 3, 15, 27–28, 38–39, 49–50)
Codex Claromontanus

of the death and resurrection of Jesus (15:1–11)

Verses 1–2

Verses 3–7

The resurrection kerygma

Origins of the kerygma

The kerygma of death, burial, resurrection and appearance, and the specific appearances to Peter and the Twelve in verses 3–5, are assumed to be an early pre-Pauline kerygma or creedal statement. Biblical scholars note the antiquity of the creed, possibly transmitted from the Jerusalem apostolic community. though the core formula may have originated in Damascus, with the specific appearances reflecting the Jerusalem community. It may be one of the earliest kerygma's about Jesus' death and resurrection, though it is also possible that Paul himself joined together the various statements, as proposed by Urich Wilckens. It is also possible that "he appeared" was not specified in the core formula, and that the specific appearances are additions. According to Hannack, line 3b-4 form the original core, while line 5 and line 7 contain competing statements from two different factions. Prive also argues that line 5 and line 7 reflect the tensions between Petrus and James.

The kerygma has often been dated to no more than five years after Jesus' death by Biblical scholars, though Bart Ehrman states "Among scholars I personally know, except for evangelicals, I don’t now[sic] anyone who thinks this at all." Gerd Lüdemann maintains that "the elements in the tradition are to be dated to the first two years after the crucifixion of Jesus[...] not later than three years".

For orthodox Christians, the resurrection, believed by them to be a physical resurrection, is the central event of the Christian faith. While the authenticity of line 6a and 7 is disputed, MacGregor argues that linguistic analysis suggests that the version received by Paul seems to have included verses 3b–6a and 7. According to Christian apolgist Gary R. Habermas, in "Corinthians 15:3–8, Paul records an ancient oral tradition(s) that summarizes the content of the Christian gospel." N.T Wright describes it as "the very early tradition that was common to all Christians."

In dissent from the majority view, Robert M. Price, Hermann Detering, John V. M. Sturdy, and David Oliver Smith have each argued that 1 Corinthians 15:3–7 is a later interpolation. According to Price, the text is not an early Christian creed written within five years of Jesus' death, nor did Paul write these verses. In his assessment, this was an Interpolation possibly dating to the beginning of the 2nd century. Price states that "The pair of words in verse 3a, "received / delivered" (paralambanein / paradidonai) is, as has often been pointed out, technical language for the handing on of rabbinical tradition," so it would contradict Paul's account of his conversion given in Galatians 1:13–24, which explicitly says that Paul had been taught the gospel of Christ by Jesus himself, not by any other man.

Meaning and background

Raised from the dead
According to Larry Hurtado, soon after his death Jesus' followers believed he was raised from the dead by God and exalted to divine status as Lord "at God's 'right hand'," which "associates him in astonishing ways with God." According to Larry Hurtado, powerful religious experiences were an indispensable factor in the emergence of this Christ-devotion. Those experiences "seem to have included visions of (and/or ascents to) God's heaven, in which the glorified Christ was seen in an exalted position." Those experiences were interpreted in the framework of God's redemptive purposes, as reflected in the scriptures, in a "dynamic interaction between devout, prayerful searching for, and pondering over, scriptural texts and continuing powerful religious experiences." This initiated a "new devotional pattern unprecedented in Jewish monotheism", that is, the worship of Jesus next to God, giving a central place to Jesus because his ministry, and its consequences, had a strong impact on his early followers. Revelations, including those visions, but also inspired and spontaneous utterances, and "charismatic exegesis" of the Jewish scriptures, convinced them that this devotion was commanded by God.

"Died for our sins"
In the Jerusalem , from which Paul may have received this creed, the phrase "died for our sins" probably was an apologetic rationale for the death of Jesus as being part of God's plan and purpose, as evidenced in the scriptures. The phrase "died for our sins" was derived from Isaiah, especially Isaiah 53:4–11, and Maccabees 4, especially :

According to Geza Vermes, for Paul, 1 Corinthians 15:3 may have referred to Genesis 22, narrating the Binding of Isaac, in which Abraham is willing to sacrifice Isaac, his only son, obeying to the will of God.

"Raised on the third day"
"Raised on the third day" is derived from Hosea 6:1–2:

Verses 8–11

Resurrection of the dead (15:12–58)

Jesus and the believers (15:12–19)
In verses 12–19, Paul, in response to some expressed doubts of the Corinthian congregation, whom he is addressing in the letter, adduces the fundamental importance of the resurrection as a Christian doctrine. Through those verses, Paul is stressing the importance of the resurrection of Jesus Christ and its relevance to the core of Christianity. Paul rebukes the church at Corinth by saying that if Jesus did not resurrect after the crucifixion, then there is no point in the Christian faith.

Verse 15

Verse 17

Verses 20–28: the last enemy
In verses 20–28, Paul states that Christ will return in power and put his "enemies under his feet" (25) and even death, "the last enemy", shall be destroyed: "The last enemy that shall be destroyed is death."

Verse 27
1 Corinthians 15:27 refers to Psalm 8:6. Ephesians 1:22 also refers to this verse of Psalm 8.

Verse 29: baptism for the dead

Verse 29 suggests that there existed a practice at Corinth whereby a living person would be baptized instead of some convert who had recently died. Teignmouth Shore, writing in Ellicott's Commentary for Modern Readers, notes that among the "numerous and ingenious conjectures" about this passage, the only tenable interpretation is that there existed a practice of baptising a living person to substitute those who had died before that sacrament could have been administered in Corinth, as also existed among the Marcionites in the second century, or still earlier than that, among a sect called "the Corinthians". The Jerusalem Bible states that "What this practice was is unknown. Paul does not say if he approved of it or not: he uses it merely for an ad hominem argument".

The Latter Day Saint movement interprets this passage to support the practice of baptism for the dead. This principle of vicarious work for the dead is an important work of the Church of Jesus Christ of Latter-day Saints in the dispensation of the fulness of times. This interpretation is rejected by other denominations of Christianity.

Be not deceived (15:33–34)

Verse 33 contains a quotation from classical Greek literature. According to the church historian Socrates of Constantinople it is taken from a Greek tragedy of Euripides, but modern scholarship, following Jerome attributes it to the comedy  by Menander, or Menander quoting Euripides. It might not have been a direct quote by Paul: "This saying was widely known as a familiar quotation." Whatever the case may be, this quote does seem to appear in one of the fragments of Euripides' works.

Resurrection of the body (15:35–58)

The chapter closes with an account of the nature of the resurrection, that in the Last Judgement the dead will be raised and both the living and the dead transformed into "spiritual bodies" (verse 44).

Verses 51–53

Verses 51–53 emphasise that through the power of Jesus Christ "Death is swallowed up in victory" (verse 54). Referring to a verse in the Book of Hosea (13:14), Paul asks: "O death where is thy sting? O grave where is thy victory?" (verse 55), thus equating sin with death and the Judaic Law, which have now been conquered and superseded by the victory of Christ.

Uses

Church
The Catechism of the Catholic Church refers to 1 Corinthians 15:

Readings from the text are used at funerals in the Catholic Church, where mourners are assured of the "sure and certain expectation of the resurrection to a better life".

Literature
In the book Harry Potter and the Deathly Hallows by J. K. Rowling, the inscription on the headstone of Harry Potter's parents has the engraving of the words: "The last enemy that shall be destroyed is death". This is taken from the King James Version of 1 Corinthians 15:26.

Music
The King James Version of verses 20–22 and 51–57 from this chapter is cited as texts in the English-language oratorio "Messiah" by George Frideric Handel (HWV 56).

See also
 Commentary on the Apocalypse
 Resurrection of Jesus
 Related Bible parts: Genesis 2, Romans 5, Romans 6, Galatians 1

Notes

References

Sources
Printed sources

 

 

 
 
 

 

 
 

 

Web-sources

External links 
 King James Bible - Wikisource
English Translation with Parallel Latin Vulgate
Online Bible at GospelHall.org (ESV, KJV, Darby, American Standard Version, Bible in Basic English)
Multiple bible versions at Bible Gateway (NKJV, NIV, NRSV etc.)
 A Refresher Course on the Resurrection of the Dead

 
Afterlife in Christianity
15
Post-resurrection appearances of Jesus
Resurrection of Jesus